Robert K. Hamilton (September 3, 1905 – November 10, 1986) was a Speaker of the Pennsylvania House of Representatives.

Hamilton was first elected to the Pennsylvania House of Representatives in 1941 and served through 1946.  He served another nonconsecutive tenure from 1949 until 1972 .

Hamilton was Ambridge, Beaver County, Pennsylvania.

1905 births
1986 deaths
Speakers of the Pennsylvania House of Representatives
Democratic Party members of the Pennsylvania House of Representatives
People from Ambridge, Pennsylvania
20th-century American politicians